The Nord-Amerikanischer Sängerbund (English: North American Singers' Association) is an association which promotes the culture of German music, culture and song.

Eligibility for the association is open to any independent Germanic singing society located in North America consisting of at least 12 singers at the time of their application.

History

In 1848, the singer districts (Sängerbezirks) of Ohio, Kentucky, Maryland, and Indiana created the Nord-Amerikanischer Sängerbund.  It is estimated that by 1908, there were 50,000 singer-members in the Sängerbund.  Membership in individual clubs consists of immigrants from Germany and their descendants to germanophiles who enjoy German song and culture.

Sängerfests 
There have been Sängerfests since 1849, and as of 2013, there have been 61 Sängerfests held anywhere from annually to an 11-year gap during 1938 to 1949, a period of World War II, and recovery in Europe and the US.  Sängerfests have been consistently held every three years since 1949.

Choir Districts (Sängerbezirks)

The NASB is divided into eight main districts, and one independent district not aligned with the other districts.

External links 

Non-profit organizations based in Ohio
Musical groups established in 1848
German-American organizations